The Ottonian Renaissance was a renaissance of Byzantine and Late Antique art in Central and Southern Europe that accompanied the reigns of the first three Holy Roman Emperors of the Ottonian (or Saxon) dynasty: Otto I (936–973), Otto II (973–983), and Otto III (983–1002), and which in large part depended upon their patronage. The leading figures in this movement were Pope Sylvester II and Abbo of Fleury.

Historiography

The concept of a renaissance was first applied to the Ottonian period by the German historian Hans Naumann - more precisely, his work published in 1927 grouped the Carolingian and Ottonian periods together under the title Karolingische und ottonische Renaissance (The Carolingian and Ottonian Renaissance). This was only two years after Erna Patzelt's coining of the term 'Carolingian Renaissance' (Die Karolingische Renaissance: Beiträge zur Geschichte der Kultur des frühen Mittelalters, Vienna, 1924), and the same year as Charles H. Haskins published The Renaissance of the Twelfth Century (Cambridge Mass., 1927)

One of three  medieval renaissances, the Ottonian Renaissance began after King Otto's marriage to Adelaide of Italy (951) united the Italian and German kingdoms, and thus brought the West closer to Byzantium. He furthered the cause of Christian (political) unity with his Imperial coronation in 962 by the Pope at St. Peter's Basilica in Rome.

The period is sometimes extended to cover the reign of Emperor Henry II (1014-1024) as well, and, rarely, his Salian successors. The term is generally confined to Imperial court culture conducted in Latin in Germany. - it is sometimes also known as the Renaissance of the 10th Century, or 10th Century Renaissance,  so as to include developments outside Germania, or as the Year 1000 Renewal, due to coming right at the end of the 10th century. It was shorter than the preceding Carolingian Renaissance and to a large extent a continuation of it - this has led historians such as Pierre Riché to prefer evoking it as a 'third Carolingian renaissance', covering the 10th century and running over into the 11th century, with the 'first Carolingian renaissance' occurring during Charlemagne's own reign and the 'second Carolingian renaissance' happening under his successors.

Libraries
Libraries were created and enriched during the Ottonian Renaissance through the intense activity of the monastic scriptoria and were the subject of further developments in the 10th century, as evidenced by the catalogs that have survived. The catalog of Bobbio Abbey lists almost 600 works, that of Fleury Abbey nearly the same count. Gerbert (the future Pope Sylvester II) played an important role in the acquisition and inventory of the library of Bobbio, and spent his wealth to fund his collection. Adso of Montier-en-Der's book chest included a large number of books such as those of Porphyry, Aristotle, Terence, Cicero, and Virgil.

Logic
The Logica vetus (consisting of translations of Aristotle by Boethius and Porphyry and the Topica  of Cicero) remained the basis of dialectic education; Gerbert, the future Pope Sylvester II was familiar with these books and was noted for his mastery of dialectics during the dispute of Ravenna against Otric in 980, and in his treatise De rationalis et ratione uti (Of the rational and the use of reason), composed in 997 and dedicated to Otto III, Holy Roman Emperor. Abbo of Fleury wrote commentaries on these works through two treatises.

An anthology of dialectical works dating from Fulbert of Chartres and probably from his library, contains the Isagoge of Porphyry, the Categories of Aristotle, the distinction between rhetoric and dialectic of Fulbert himself, the Topica of Cicero, the De Interpretatione of Aristotle, Boethius three comments and de Ratione written by Gerbert in 997. The development of dialectics was furthered by Majolus of Cluny.

Sciences

The growing interest in the disciplines of the quadrivium (arithmetic, geometry, music and astronomy) was translated to the teachings of the leading scholars of their time, such as Abbo of Fleury who wrote many treatises on the calculation of the computus, astronomical subjects such as the trajectories of the sun, moon and planets, and a star catalogue.

The future Pope Sylvester II, introduced the use of wooden terrestrial spheres for the astronomical study of the movement of the earth, planets and constellations, the use of the monochord for musical study, and construction of the abacus for arithmetic studies. Fulbert of Chartres introduced the use of Arabic numerals.

Hermann of Reichenau, of the school of Reichenau, was famed for his treatises on the astrolabe, calculus and music.

Arts
The Ottonian Renaissance is recognized especially in the arts and architecture, invigorated by renewed contact with Constantinople, in some revived cathedral schools, such as that of Archbishop Bruno of Cologne, in the production of illuminated manuscripts from a handful of elite scriptoria, such as Quedlinburg Abbey, founded by Otto in 936, and in political ideology. The Imperial court became the center of religious and spiritual life, led by the example of women of the royal family: Matilda the literate mother of Otto I, his sister Gerberga of Saxony, or his consort Adelaide. The Byzantine influence further increased with the marriage of Otto II with Princess Theophanu, who upon her husband's death in 983 ruled as Empress dowager for her minor son Otto III until 991.

After Otto I's Imperial coronation, there emerged a renewed faith in the idea of Empire in Otto's immediate circle and a reformed church, creating a period of heightened cultural and artistic fervor. Ottonian art was a court art, created to confirm a direct Holy and Imperial lineage as a source of legitimized power linked from Constantine and Justinian. In this atmosphere the masterpieces that were created fused the traditions which the new art was based on: paintings from Late Antiquity, the Carolingian period, and Byzantium.  In this way, the term is used as an analogue to the Carolingian Renaissance which accompanied Charlemagne's coronation in 800.

A small group of Ottonian monasteries received direct sponsorship from the Emperor and bishops and produced some magnificent medieval illuminated manuscripts, the premier art form of the time. Corvey produced some of the first manuscripts, followed by the scriptorium at Hildesheim after 1000. The most famous Ottonian scriptorium was at the island monastery of Reichenau on Lake Constance: hardly any other works have formed the image of Ottonian art as much as the miniatures which originated there. One of the greatest Reichenau works was the Codex Egberti, containing narrative miniatures of the life of Christ, the earliest such cycle, in a fusion of styles including Carolingian traditions as well as traces of insular and Byzantine influences. Other well known manuscripts included the Reichenau Evangeliary, the Liuther Codex, the Pericopes of Henry II, the Bamberg Apocalypse and the Hitda Codex.

Hroswitha of Gandersheim characterises the changes which took place during the time.  She was a nun who composed verse and drama, based on the classical works of Terence.  The architecture of the period was also innovative and represents a predecessor to the later Romanesque.

Politically, theories of Christian unity and empire thrived, as well as revived classical notions of Imperial grandeur in the West. By Otto II's Greek wife Theophanu, Byzantine iconography entered the West.  The globus cruciger became a symbol of kingly power and the Holy Roman Emperors were represented as crowned by Christ in the Byzantine fashion.  It was in trying to revive the "glory that was Rome" that Otto III made the Eternal City his capital and increased in Greco-Roman fashion the ceremony of the court.

Schools also revived under the influence of the Dukes of Naples and Capua where the illustrious Bishop St Alfanus I, an imitator of ancient writers, was closely involved in music, astronomy and medicine.

Leading figures of the Ottonian Renaissance
Bernward of Hildesheim
Hroswitha of Gandersheim
Otto I, Otto II, Otto III, and Henry II
Hermannus Contractus
Gerbert of Aurillac, pope as Sylvester II
Theophanu
Liutprand of Cremona, author of Historia Ottonis ("The Deeds of Otto")
Bruno I, Archbishop of Cologne
Widukind of Corvey, author of Res gestae Saxonicae ("The Deeds of the Saxons")
Adelaide, Abbess of Vilich
Egbert, Archbishop of Trier 

See also
 Ottonian art (Pre-Romanesque art)
 Ottonian architecture

Notes

References
Harlie Kay Gallatin, "Western Europe in the High Middle Ages: An Overview From c. 900 to c. 1300": "Ottonian Renaissance"
Hermann Aubin, Otto der Grosse und die Erneuerung des abendländischen Kaisertums im Jahre 962 (1962)

Ottonian period
Ottonian art